Clarkson is a common English surname.

Etymology
It is derived from a patronymic form of an occupational name. The surname means "son of the clerk", and refers to a scribe or secretary. The surname is derived from the Old English clerc, which means priest; the Old English words were later reinforced by the Old French form of the word clerc. Both the Old English and Old French words are from the Late Latin clericus, which is derived from the Greek , which is in turn a derivative of kleros, which means "inheritance", "legacy".

An early instances of the surname in English records is "le Clerkissone", in 1308; "Clerksone", in 1332; and "Clarkson", in 1491.

Persons with the surname
Adrienne Clarkson (born 1939), former Governor General of Canada
Alastair Clarkson (born 1968), Australian rules football coach and former player
A. E. Clarkson (Albert Ernest Clarkson 1876–1936), South Australian businessman
Alison H. Clarkson (born 1955), American politician
Bayard D. Clarkson (born 1926), American physician, hematologist, and oncologist
Bob Clarkson (born 1939), New Zealand politician
Courtney Clarkson (born 1991), Australian rules footballer 
David Clarkson (disambiguation)
David Clarkson (born 1984), professional ice hockey player
Ellis Clarkson ( — October 1947) English rugby league footballer who played in the 1900s and 1910s
Jeremy Clarkson (born 1960), English motoring journalist and former co-presenter of BBC TV series Top Gear
John Clarkson (1861-1909), American baseball player
John Clarkson (abolitionist) (1764-1828) British Royal Navy officer and founder of Freetown, Sierra Leone
Jordan Clarkson (born 1992), Filipino-American basketball player
Julian Clarkson, English baritone
Kelly Clarkson (born 1982), American Idol winner; singer/songwriter
Kenneth L. Clarkson, American computer scientist
Kevin Clarkson, Attorney General of Alaska
Lana Clarkson (1962–2003), American actress and murder victim
Margaret Clarkson (born 1941), English artist who paints nostalgic scenes
Nathaniel James Clarkson (born 1978), British record producer, aka Nat Clarxon & NJC
Patricia Clarkson (born 1959), American actress
Phil Clarkson, English footballer
Robert Clarkson, American tax protester
Stephen Clarkson (born 1937), Canadian political scientist
Stu Clarkson (1919–1957), American football player
Thomas Clarkson (1760–1846), British abolitionist
Tony Clarkson (born 1939), English cricketer
Walter Clarkson (1878–1946), American baseball player
William Clarkson (disambiguation)
William Clarkson (1859–1934) Australian vice admiral
Willy Clarkson (1861–1934), theatrical costume designer and wigmaker

Fictional characters
 Tom Clarkson, a fictional character in the BBC television drama Waterloo Road, played by Jason Done.
 Louise Clarkson, a fictional character in the American TV series, Everybody Hates Chris, played by Whoopi Goldberg.
 Myles Clarkson, played by Alan Alda in the 1971 American horror film, The Mephisto Waltz

References

English-language surnames
Occupational surnames
Patronymic surnames
English-language occupational surnames